Margaret Masterman (4 May 1910 – 1 April 1986) was a British linguist and philosopher, most known for her pioneering work in the field of computational linguistics and especially machine translation. She founded the Cambridge Language Research Unit.

Biography 
Margaret Masterman was born in London on 4 May 1910 to Charles F. G. Masterman, a British radical Liberal Party politician and head of the War Propaganda Bureau, and Lucy Blanche Lyttelton, a politician, poet and writer. In 1932 she married Richard Bevan Braithwaite, a philosopher. They had a son, Lewis Charles (born 1937) and a daughter, Catherine Lucy (born 1940).

Work 
Margaret Masterman was one of six students in Wittgenstein's course of 1933–34 whose notes were compiled as The Blue Book. In 1955 she founded and directed the Cambridge Language Research Unit (CLRU), which grew from an informal discussion group to a major research centre in computational linguistics in its time. She was a student at Newnham College, Cambridge and read modern languages and then Moral Sciences (as philosophy was then called). The Cambridge Language Research Unit was founded in a small but beautiful building called Adie's Museum which had housed far eastern art: small Buddhist sculptures were built into its walls and carved doors. For a period of twenty years starting in 1953 it was a source of significant research in machine translation, computational linguistics, and quantum physics even though outside the official university structures in Cambridge. It was funded by grants from US agencies (AFOSR, ONR, NSF), UK Government agencies (OSTI) and later, from EU funds in Luxembourg. Its computing facilities were primitive—an ancient ICL 1202 computer---and most of its more serious computation was done either on the Cambridge university machine, in the then Mathematical Laboratory—or by CLRU visitors at sites in the US. One measure of its impact, and from a staff that never exceeded ten people, was that of the Annual Lifetime Achievement Awards from the Association for Computational Linguistics in the US, three have been awarded to CLRU alumni: Martin Kay, Karen Spärck Jones and Yorick Wilks.

Margaret Masterman was ahead of her time by some twenty years: many of her beliefs and proposals for language processing by computer have now become part of the common stock of ideas in the artificial intelligence (AI) and machine translation (MT) fields.  She was never able to lay adequate claim to them because they were unacceptable when she published them, and so when they were written up later by her students or independently "discovered" by others, there was no trace back to her, especially in these fields where little or nothing over ten years old is ever reread.

The core of her beliefs about language processing was that it must reflect the coherence of language, its redundancy as a signal.  This idea was a partial inheritance from the old "information theoretic" view of language: for her, it meant that processes analysing language must take into account its repetitive and redundant structures and that a writer goes on saying the same thing again and again in different ways; only if the writer does that can the ambiguities be removed from the signal.  This sometimes led her to overemphasise the real and explicit redundancy she would find in rhythmical and repetitive verse and claim, implausibly, that normal English was just like that if only we could see it right.

This led in later years to the key role she assigned to rhythm, stress, breathgroupings and the boundaries they impose on text and the processes of understanding.  To put it crudely, her claim was that languages are the way they are, at least in part, because they are produced by creatures that breathe at fairly regular intervals.  It will be obvious why such claims could not even be entertained while Chomsky's views were preeminent in language studies. However she could never give systematic surface criteria by which the breathgroups and stress patterns were to be identified by surface cues, or could be reduced to other criteria such as syntax or morphology, nor would she become involved in the actual physics of voice patterns.

Her views on the importance of semantics in language processing (which, she continued to defend in the high years of Chomskyan syntax between 1951 and 1966) were much influenced by R. H. Richens' views on classification and description by means of a language of semantic primitives with its own syntax.   These, along with associated claims about semantic pattern matching onto surface text, were developed in actual programs, from which it might be assumed that she was a straightforward believer in the existence of semantic primitives in some Katzian or Schankian sense.  Nothing could be further from the truth: for she was far too much a Wittgensteinian sceptic about the ability of any limited sublanguage or logic to take on the role of the whole language.  She always argued that semantic primitives would only make sense if there were empirical criteria for their discovery and a theory that allowed for the fact that they, too, would develop exactly the polysemy of any higher or natural language; and she always emphasised the functional role of primitives in, for example, resolving sense ambiguity and as an interlingua for MT.

She hoped that the escape from the problem of the origin of semantic primitives would lie in either empirical classification procedures operating on actual texts (in the way some now speak of deriving primitives by massive connectionist learning), or by having an adequate formal theory of the structure of thesauri, which she believed to make explicit certain underlying structures of the semantic relations in a natural language: a theory such that "primitives" would emerge naturally as the organizing classification of thesauri.  For some years, she and colleagues explored lattice theory as the underlying formal structure of such thesauri.

Two other concerns that went through her intellectual life owe much to the period when Michael Halliday, as the University Lecturer in Chinese at Cambridge, was a colleague at C.L.R.U.  She got from him the idea that syntactic theory was fundamentally semantic or pragmatic, in either its categories and their fundamental definition, or in terms of the role of syntax as an organizing principle for semantic information.  She was the first AI researcher to be influenced by Halliday, long before Terry Winograd. Again, she became preoccupied for a considerable period with the nature and function of Chinese ideograms, because she felt they clarified in an empirical way problems that Wittgenstein had wrestled with in his so-called picture-theory-of-truth.   This led her to exaggerate the generality of ideogrammatic principles and to seem to hold that English was really rather like Chinese if only seen correctly, with its meaning atoms, highly ambiguous and virtually uninflected.  It was a view that found little or no sympathy in the dominant linguistic or computational currents of the time.

Her main creation in 1953, one which endured for twenty years, was the Cambridge Language Research Unit, which grew out of an informal discussion group with a very heterogeneous membership interested in language from philosophical and computational points of view.  Subsequently, the attempt to build language processing programs which had a sound philosophical basis was a distinctive feature of the Unit's work.  This approach to language processing, and the specific form it took in the use of a thesaurus as the main vehicle for semantic operations, will probably come to be seen as the Unit's major contributions to the field as a whole, and it was Margaret who was primarily responsible for them.  Her vision of language processing and its possibilities was remarkable at a time when computers were very rudimentary: indeed much of the C.L.R.U.'s work had to be done on the predecessors of computers, namely Hollerith punched card machines.  Equally, Margaret's determination in establishing and maintaining the Unit, with the enormous effort in fund raising that this involved, was very striking: the fact that it could continue for decades, and through periods when public support for such work was hard to come by, is a tribute to Margaret's persistence and charm.  It is difficult for us now, in these days of artificial intelligence in the ordinary market place, and very powerful personal computers, to realise how hard it was to get the financial resources needed for language-processing research, and the technical resources to do actual experiments.

Perhaps the best comment on Margaret's initiative in embarking on language processing research, and specifically on machine translation work, comes from a somewhat unexpected source.  Machine translation, after an initial period of high hopes, and some large claims, was cast into outer darkness in 1966 by funding agencies who saw little return for their money. Reviewing twenty five years of artificial intelligence research in his presidential address to the American Association for Artificial Intelligence in 1985, Woody Bledsoe, one of the long-standing leaders of the field, though in areas quite outside language, said of those who attempted machine translation in the fifties and sixties: "They may have failed, but they were right to try; we have learned so much from their attempts to do something so difficult".

What she and C.L.R.U. were trying to do was far ahead of its time.   Efforts were made to tackle fundamental problems with the computers of the day that had the capacity of a modern digital wrist watch.  Despite every kind of problem, the Unit produced numerous publications on language and related subjects, including information retrieval and automatic classification.   For over ten years the Unit's presence was strongly felt in the field, always with an emphasis on basic semantic problems of language understanding.   Margaret had no time for those who felt that all that needed doing was syntactic parsing, or that complete parsing was necessary before you did anything else.  Now that the semantics of language are regarded as a basic part of its understanding by machine, the ideas of C.L.R.U. seem curiously modern.

Margaret's main contribution to the life of CLRU was in the continual intellectual stimulus she gave to its research, and through this to the larger natural language processing community: she had wide-ranging concerns, and lateral ideas, which led her, for example, to propose the thesaurus as a means of carrying out many distinct language processing tasks, like indexing and translation.  Margaret's emphasis on algorithms, and on testing them, was vital for the development of CLRU's work on language processing; but her ideas were notable, especially for those who worked with her, not just for their Intellectual qualities, but for their sheer joyousness.

Serious research stopped at CLRU about 1978 and Margaret tried to restart the CLRU in 1980 with William Williams in the hope that the new breed of micro-computers could be used to develop her algorithms for natural language translation. Margaret walked the 7 miles from Millington Road in Cambridge to Orwell and purchased two North Star Horizon computers from Intelligent Artefacts (see ST Robotics). These were installed with the Forth programming language, written by David Sands and used by various students from the University of Cambridge who programmed Margaret's algorithms into the computers. Margaret's approach to natural language translation at this time was to split a sentence into "breath group" segments. Since each breath group had a unique meaning it could be translated into the target language and the target sentence reconstructed using the translated breath groups. This contrasted with the predominant language translation techniques of the time, notably Systran which used a dictionary and rule based system still used today. When Margaret died in 1986 William Williams closed down CLRU and its unique library of early MT documents were dumped into a skip, even though two university bodies had offered to give it a home.

She was one of cofounders of Lucy Cavendish College and its first Vice-President (1965–1975). She was a great-niece of Lucy Cavendish after whom the college is named. She also was a founder and the major inspiration of the Epiphany Philosophers, a group which shared some membership with the CLRU and was dedicated to the study of the relationship of science and religion and the forms of religious practice.

In 1965, Margaret Masterman read the work: "The Nature of a Paradigm" at the Fourth International Colloquium in the Philosophy of Science, in London. She conducted a detailed textual criticism of Thomas S. Kuhn's book, The Structure of Scientific Revolutions (1962), characterizing the book as "at once scientifically perspicuous and philosophically obscure."  Masterman praised Kuhn as "one of the outstanding philosophers of science of our time" and his concept of paradigms as "a fundamental idea and a new one in the philosophy of science."  She criticised Thomas Kuhn for his vague and inconsistent use of the concept "Paradigm," noting that it is used in at least 21 different senses, which can be summarized in three groups:  metaparadigms, sociological paradigms, and artefact or construct paradigms. Masterman proposed that Kuhn's critics in the philosophy of science dealt only with metaparadigms and explored the insights and implications of the various conceptions.  This criticism was accepted by Thomas Kuhn and was crucial in the shift of the concept "Paradigm" to "Incommensurability".

Notes

References 
 
 Lucy Cavendish College Archive
 

 

 

1910 births
1986 deaths
Linguists from the United Kingdom
Women linguists
Computational linguistics researchers
Fellows of Lucy Cavendish College, Cambridge
Alumni of Newnham College, Cambridge
English women philosophers
20th-century linguists
20th-century English women
20th-century English people